Fawzi Al-Mulki's cabinet was the first cabinet after Hussein of Jordan became a king on 2 May 1953. It's the 28th cabinate after the establishment of the Emirate of Transjordan in 1921. This cabinet worked for only one year starting 5 May 1953 until the resignation on 4 May 1954.

Cabinet members
 Fawzi Al-Mulki: Prime Minister and Defense Minister 
 Sa`id al-Mufti: Deputy prime minister and minister of state
 Suliman Sukkar: minister of finance.
 Ahmad Toukan: Education minister.
 Anstas Hanania: Trade minister
 Anwar Khatib: Economic, Development and Constructions 
 Hekmat Al-Masri: Agriculture minister.
 Husayn al-Khalidi: Foreign Affairs minister
 Shafiq Irshaidat: Justice and Transportation.
 Mustafa Khalifa: Health and Social affairs
 Bahjat Talhouni: Interior Affairs minister.

Resource
 الحكومات الأردنية في عهد جلالة الملك الحسين بن طلال (1953-1967)، تأليف الدكتور عمر صالح العمري والدكتور زيد محمد خضر. الجزء الأول، 2011م. 

Cabinet of Jordan
Cabinets established in 1953